Christopher Alan Curtis (born July 15, 1987) is an American mixed martial artist currently competing in the middleweight division of the Ultimate Fighting Championship (UFC). A professional since 2009, he has also competed for the Professional Fighters League (PFL). As of December 13, 2022, he is #14 in the UFC middleweight rankings.

Background 
Curtis was born and grew up in Cincinnati, Ohio. He has a sister and a brother. Despite aspirations of becoming a lawyer, he dropped out of the law school in pursuit of a career in mixed martial arts.

Mixed martial arts career

Early career 
Curtis amassed a record of 18–5 in the North American regional circuit while capturing Welterweight Championships in CES MMA, Z Promotions and Premier MMA Championship.

Dana White's Tuesday Night Contender Series and first retirement 
Curtis was then invited to face Sean Lally at Dana White's Contender Series 9 on June 12, 2018. He won the fight via third-round knockout but retired after he was not awarded a UFC contract.

Curtis would however return to fight for the vacant Z Promotions Middleweight title against Matt Dwyer on January 21, 2019, winning the bout via majority decision.

Professional Fighters League
On April 1, 2019, it was revealed that Curtis would be participating PFL 2019 season in the welterweight division. He was initially set to face PFL Season 2018 Middleweight Champion Louis Taylor at PFL 1 on May 9, 2019. However, Taylor was not able to get medically cleared and had to withdraw from the season, subsequently being replaced by André Fialho. Curtis won the bout via third-round knockout.

In the second regular season bout Curtis faced PFL Season 2018 Welterweight Champion Magomed Magomedkerimov at PFL 4 on July 11, 2019. He lost the fight via unanimous decision but advanced to the playoffs.

Playoffs, second and third retirement
In the quarterfinals Curtis faced Magomedkerimov in a rematch at PFL 7 on October 11, 2019. Again he lost the bout via unanimous decision, was eliminated from the season and retired from the sport.

However, after their bout Magomedkerimov fell ill and Curtis ended his retirement by stepping in to replace Magomedkerimov against Ray Cooper III in a semifinal bout. He lost the fight via second-round knockout and retired from the sport once again.

Return from retirement and other organizations
Curtis would, however, quickly return from retirement to defend his Z Promotions title in January 2020, defeating Darren Smith Jr. via corner stoppage at the end of the fourth.

On April 14, 2020, it was announced that Curtis had came out of retirement and signed a multi-fight contract with ARES FC. He was scheduled to make his promotional debut against Nassourdine Imavov at ARES FC 2 on April 3, 2020. However, the event was postponed due to the COVID-19 pandemic to take place on October 30, 2020, before being cancelled altogether.

Curtis was scheduled to face Austin Vanderford on November 5, 2020 at Bellator 251. However, Curtis had to pull out of the bout due to a positive COVID test and was replaced by Vinicius de Jesus.

Curtis faced Kyle Stewart on January 30, 2021 at XMMA 1. He won the bout via TKO in the third round.

After winning the next two bouts against Juan Ramon Grano Medina at iKon Fighting Federation 6 via first round TKO and Jarome Hatch at Fierce FC 15 via TKO stoppage in the third, Curtis faced Kenny Robertson on July 30, 2021 at XMMA 2. He won the bout via unanimous decision.

Ultimate Fighting Championship 
Curtis was briefly expected to replace Deron Winn against Phil Hawes on day's notice at UFC on ESPN 26 on October 9, 2021, but Hawes ultimately declined the bout. Nevertheless, the bout was later rebooked to take place at UFC 268 on November 6, 2021. Curtis won the fight via first-round knockout.

Replacing Roman Dolidze on short notice, Curtis faced Brendan Allen on December 4, 2021 at UFC on ESPN: Font vs. Aldo. He won the fight via technical knockout in round two. The win earned him a Performance of the Night bonus award.

Curtis was then expected to face Dricus Du Plessis at UFC 273 on April 9, 2022. However, Curtis withdrew from the bout due to a wrist injury and was replaced by Anthony Hernandez.

Curtis then faced Rodolfo Vieira at UFC on ESPN: Tsarukyan vs. Gamrot on June 25, 2022. He won the fight via unanimous decision.

Curtis faced Jack Hermansson on July 23, 2022, at UFC Fight Night 208, replacing the injured Darren Till.  He lost the fight via unanimous decision.

Curtis faced Joaquin Buckley on December 10, 2022 at UFC 282. He won the fight via technical knockout in round two.

Curtis is scheduled to face Kelvin Gastelum  on  April 8, 2023, at UFC 287.

Personal life 
Curtis has a son from a previous relationship.

Championships and achievements 
Ultimate Fighting Championship
Performance of the Night (Two times) 
CES MMA
CES MMA Welterweight Championship (one time; former)
Two successful title defenses
Z Promotions
Z Promotions Welterweight Championship (one time; former)
One successful title defense
Z Promotions Middleweight Championship (one time; former)
Premier MMA Championship
PMMAC Welterweight Championship (one time; former)
MMAjunkie.com
2021 Comeback Fighter of the Year

Mixed martial arts record 

|- 
|Win
|align=center|30–9
|Joaquin Buckley
|KO (punches)
|UFC 282
|
|align=center|2
|align=center|2:49
|Las Vegas, Nevada, United States
|
|-
|Loss
|align=center|29–9
|Jack Hermansson
|Decision (unanimous)
|UFC Fight Night: Blaydes vs. Aspinall
|
|align=center|3
|align=center|5:00
|London, England
|
|-
|Win
|align=center|29–8
|Rodolfo Vieira
|Decision (unanimous)
|UFC on ESPN: Tsarukyan vs. Gamrot
|
|align=center|3
|align=center|5:00
|Las Vegas, Nevada, United States
|
|-
|Win
|align=center|28–8
|Brendan Allen
|TKO (punches and knees)
|UFC on ESPN: Font vs. Aldo 
|
|align=center|2
|align=center|1:58
|Las Vegas, Nevada, United States
|
|-
|Win
|align=center|27–8
|Phil Hawes
|KO (punches)
|UFC 268
|
|align=center|1
|align=center|4:27
|New York City, New York, United States
|
|-
|Win
|align=center|26–8
|Kenny Robertson
|Decision (unanimous)
|XMMA 2: Saunders vs. Nijem
|
|align=center|3
|align=center|5:00
|Greenville, South Carolina, United States
|
|-
|Win
|align=center|25–8
|Jarome Hatch
|TKO (strikes)
|Fierce FC 15
|
|align=center|3
|align=center|1:30
|West Valley City, Utah, United States
|
|-
|Win
|align=center|24–8
|Juan Ramon Grano Medina
|TKO (punches)
|iKon Fighting Federation 6
|
|align=center|1
|align=center|4:13
|Sinaloa, Mexico
|
|-
|Win
|align=center|23–8
|Kyle Stewart
|TKO (punches)
|XMMA 1: Vick vs. Fialho
|
|align=center|3
|align=center|1:41
|West Palm Beach, Florida, United States
|
|-
|Win
|align=center|22–8
|Darren Smith Jr.
|TKO (corner stoppage)
|Z Promotions Fight Night 12
|
|align=center|4
|align=center|5:00
|Lethbridge, Canada
|
|-
|Loss
|align=center|21–8
|Ray Cooper III
|KO (punch)
|rowspan=2|PFL 7
|rowspan=2|
|align=center|2
|align=center|0:11
|rowspan=2|Las Vegas, Nevada, United States
|
|-
|Loss
|align=center|21–7
|Magomed Magomedkerimov
|Decision (unanimous)
|align=center|2
|align=center|5:00
|
|-
|Loss
|align=center|21–6
|Magomed Magomedkerimov
|Decision (unanimous)
|PFL 4
|
|align=center|3
|align=center|5:00
|Atlantic City, New Jersey, United States
|
|-
|Win
|align=center|21–5
|André Fialho
|TKO (punches)
|PFL 1
|
|align=center|3
|align=center|4:17
|Uniondale, New York, United States
|
|-
|Win
|align=center|20–5
|Matt Dwyer
|Decision (majority)
|Z Promotions Fight Night 9
|
|align=center|5
|align=center|5:00
|Lethbridge, Canada
|
|-
|Win
|align=center|19–5
|Sean Lally
|TKO (hook kick and punches)
|Dana White's Contender Series 9
|
|align=center|3
|align=center|1:37
|Las Vegas, Nevada, United States
|
|-
|Win
|align=center|18–5
|Jason Norwood
|Decision (unanimous)
|CES MMA 49
|
|align=center|5
|align=center|5:00
|Lincoln, Rhode Island, United States
|
|-
|Win
|align=center|17–5
|Peter Grajcar
|Decision (unanimous)
|Z Promotions Fight Night 5
|
|align=center|5
|align=center|5:00
|Medicine Hat, Canada
|
|-
|Win
|align=center|16–5
|Portland Pringle III
|TKO (punches)
|Premier MMA Championship 3
|
|align=center|4
|align=center|4:22
|Covington, Kentucky, United States
|
|-
|Win
|align=center|15–5
|Will Santiago Jr.
|TKO (knees and punches)
|CES MMA 42
|
|align=center|2
|align=center|1:08
|Lincoln, Rhode Island, United States
|
|-
|Win
|align=center|14–5
|Leo Bercier
|Decision (unanimous)
|Final Fight Championship 24
|
|align=center|3
|align=center|5:00
|Daytona Beach, Florida, United States
|
|-
|Loss
|align=center|13–5
|Nah-Shon Burrell
|Decision (unanimous)
|CES MMA 34
|
|align=center|5
|align=center|5:00
|Mashantucket, Connecticut, United States
|
|-
|Win
|align=center|13–4
|Gil de Freitas
|TKO (submission to punches)
|CES MMA 32
|
|align=center|1
|align=center|3:13
|Lincoln, Rhode Island, United States
|
|-
|Win
|align=center|12–4
|Amaechi Oselukwue
|Decision (unanimous)
|Absolute Action MMA 44
|
|align=center|3
|align=center|5:00
|Highland Heights, Kentucky, United States
|
|-
|Win
|align=center|11–4
|Tyson Triplett
|TKO (submission to punches)
|Absolute Action MMA 42
|
|align=center|3
|align=center|5:00
|Highland Heights, Kentucky, United States
|
|-
|Loss
|align=center|10–4
|Belal Muhammad
|Decision (unanimous)
|Hoosier Fight Club 21
|
|align=center|3
|align=center|5:00
|Valparaiso, Indiana, United States
|
|-
|Win
|align=center|10–3
|Tiawan Howard
|Submission (armbar)
|Coveted Fighting Championship 3
|
|align=center|2
|align=center|2:37
|Mentor, Ohio, United States
|
|-
|Win
|align=center|9–3
|Rex Harris
|Decision (split)
|PA Cage Fight 18
|
|align=center|3
|align=center|5:00
|Kingston, Pennsylvania, United States
|
|-
|Win
|align=center|8–3
|Ron Keslar
|Decision (unanimous)
|MMA Xtreme: Fists Will Fly
|
|align=center| 3
|align=center| 5:00
|Evansville, Indiana, United States
|
|-
|Loss
|align=center|7–3
|Forrest Petz
|Decision (unanimous)
|NAAFS: Fight Night in the Flats 9
|
|align=center|3
|align=center|5:00
|Cleveland, Ohio, United States	
|
|-
|Win
|align=center|7–2
|Andrew Trace
|Decision (unanimous)
|Turf Wars Extreme Fighting: Heavy Hitters
|
|align=center|3
|align=center|5:00
|Florence, Kentucky, United States
|
|-
|Win
|align=center|6–2
|Micah Bender
|TKO (punches)
|Rocktagon MMA: Elite Series 6
|
|align=center|2
|align=center|0:22
|North Olmsted, Ohio, United States
|
|-
|Loss
|align=center|5–2
|Tom Gallichio
|Submission (rear-naked choke)
|Xtreme Caged Combat: Reckless Abandon
|
|align=center|3
|align=center|2:08
|Philadelphia, Pennsylvania, United States
|
|-
|Win
|align=center|5–1
|Erick Jordan
|TKO (head kick and punches)
|Spartan FC 6
|
|align=center|2
|align=center|2:21
|Ashland, Kentucky, United States
|
|-
|Win
|align=center|4–1
|Rob Nickerson III
|KO (knee)
|Absolute Action MMA 6
|
|align=center|1
|align=center|0:43
|Florence, Kentucky, United States
|
|-
|Win
|align=center|3–1
|Kevin Powers
|TKO (punches)
|Universal Cage Combat: Lights, Camera, Maximum Action
|
|align=center|1
|align=center|1:33
|Lawrenceburg, Indiana, United States
|
|-
|Win
|align=center|2–1
|Nah-Shon Burrell
|Decision (unanimous)
|Xtreme Caged Combat: Hostile Intent
|
|align=center|3
|align=center|5:00
|Feasterville, Pennsylvania, United States
|
|-
|Win
|align=center|1–1
|Ian Rammel
|Decision (unanimous)
|International Combat Events 46
|
|align=center|3
|align=center|5:00
|Forest Park, Ohio, United States
|
|-
|Loss
|align=center|0–1
|Brandon Pinkston
|Decision (split)
|RFL: Maximum Impact
|
|align=center|3
|align=center|5:00
|Hammond, Indiana, United States
|
|-

Professional boxing record

See also 

 List of current UFC fighters
 List of male mixed martial artists

References

External links
 
 

1987 births
Living people
Middleweight mixed martial artists
Mixed martial artists utilizing boxing
Mixed martial artists utilizing Brazilian jiu-jitsu
Mixed martial artists utilizing wrestling
American male mixed martial artists
American male boxers
American practitioners of Brazilian jiu-jitsu
Ultimate Fighting Championship male fighters